The 29th Annual GMA Dove Awards were held on April 25, 1996 to recognizing accomplishments of musicians for the year 1995. The show was held at the Grand Ole Opry House in Nashville, Tennessee, and was hosted by Michael W. Smith.

Award recipients

Artists
Artist of the Year
dc Talk
New Artist of the Year
Jars of Clay
Group of the Year
Point of Grace
Male Vocalist of the Year
Gary Chapman
Female Vocalist of the Year
CeCe Winans
Songwriter of the Year
Michael W. Smith
Producer of the Year
Charlie Peacock

Songs
Song of the Year
“Jesus Freak”; Toby McKeehan, Mark Heimermann
Rap/Hip Hop Recorded Song of the Year
"R.I.O.T. (Righteous Invasion of Truth)"; R.I.O.T. (Righteous Invasion of Truth); Carman (TIE)
"Take Back the Beat"; Church of Rhythm; Church of Rhythm (TIE)
Rock Recorded Song of the Year
"Jesus Freak"; Jesus Freak; dc Talk
Pop/Contemporary Recorded Song of the Year
“The Great Divide”; The Whole Truth; Point of Grace
Hard Music Recorded Song of the Year
“Promise Man”; Promise Man; Holy Soldier
Southern Gospel Recorded Song of the Year
"Out of His Great Love"; The Martins; The Martins
Inspirational Recorded Song of the Year
"Man After Your Own Heart"; My Utmost for His Highest; Gary Chapman
Country Recorded Song of the Year
"Without You (I Haven't Got a Prayer)"; Give What It Takes, MidSouth
Traditional Gospel Recorded Song of the Year
"Great Is Thy Faithfulness"; Alone In His Presence; CeCe Winans
Contemporary Gospel Recorded Song of the Year
"The Call"; The Call; Anointed
Modern Rock Recorded Song of the Year
"Monkeys at the Zoo"; Everything That's on My Mind; Charlie Peacock
Urban Recorded Song of the Year
"It's In God's Hands Now"; The Call; Anointed

Albums
Rock Album of the Year
No Doubt; Petra
Pop/Contemporary Album of the Year
The Whole Truth; Point of Grace
Rap/Hip Hop Album of the Year
Church of Rhythm; Church of Rhythm
Hard Music Album of the Year
Promise Man; Holy Soldier
Inspirational Album of the Year
Unbelievable Love; Larnelle Harris
Modern Rock Album of the Year
This Beautiful Mess; Sixpence None the Richer
Urban Album of the Year
Give Your Life; Angelo & Veronica
Contemporary Gospel Album of the Year
The Call; Anointed
Traditional Gospel of the Year
He Will Come: Live; Shirley Caesar
Country Album of the Year
Where Love Runs Deep; Michael James
Southern Gospel Album of the Year
The Martins; The Martins
Special Event Album of the Year
My Utmost for His Highest; Amy Grant, Michael W. Smith, Sandi Patty, Twila Paris, Point of Grace, Gary Chapman, Cindy Morgan, Bryan Duncan, 4Him, Phillips, Craig and Dean, Steven Curtis Chapman
Instrumental Album of the Year
Classical Peace; Dino
Praise & Worship Album of the Year
Promise Keepers: Raise the Standard; Maranatha! Promise Band
Children's Music Album of the Year
School Days; Mike Gay, Sue Gay
Youth/Children's Musical Album of the Year
Salt and Light (featuring Songs from the Loft); Beverly Darnall
Musical Album
Saviour; Bob Farrell and Greg Nelson
Choral Collection Album
Praise Him... Live; The Brooklyn Tabernacle Choir
Recorded Music Packaging of the Year
My Utmost for His Highest; Loren Balman, Diane Barnes, Jeff and Lisa Franke; Matthew Barnes

Videos
Long Form Music Video of the Year
Big House; Audio Adrenaline
Short Form Music Video of the Year
"Flood"; Jars of Clay

References

GMA
1996 in American music
1996 in Tennessee
1996 music awards
GMA Dove Awards